Daniele Bracciali (born 10 January 1978) is an Italian former tennis player, best ranked world no. 21 in doubles. His career-high ATP singles ranking is world no. 49, achieved in May 2006. In doubles, he reached the semifinals of the 2012 French Open and the quarterfinals of the 2013 Australian Open. In mixed doubles, he reached the semifinals of the 2012 Australian and French Opens.

He was banned by the Italian Tennis Federation in 2015 for betting and did not play for several years, but returned in 2017. In November 2018, Bracciali was once again given a life ban having been found guilty by the Tennis Integrity Unit.

Career
Bracciali won his only ATP singles title in April 2006, at Casablanca, on clay. In the final he beat Nicolás Massú.

In his career, Bracciali has won a total of seven matches at Grand Slam tournaments, six at Wimbledon and one at the Australian Open. In 1998 and 2006, he reached the third round of Wimbledon, his best Grand Slam results. In the first round of Wimbledon in 2005, he defeated Ivo Karlović in five sets after surviving 51 aces from the Croat. He then took Andy Roddick, the previous year's runner-up (and eventual runner-up that year as well), to five sets.

2012
Recently, Bracciali has played primarily doubles. He has won five ATP titles. In 2012, he reached the third round of the 2012 Australian Open partnering Potito Starace. They were beaten by Max Mirnyi and Daniel Nestor. Later that year at the French Open, they reached their first semifinal. They were defeated again by the eventual champions, Max Mirnyi and Daniel Nestor. At Wimbledon, Bracciali partnered the Austrian veteran Julian Knowle and met Mirnyi and Nestor again in the second round. This was the first time that Bracciali won against them. Bracciali and Knowle lost in the quarterfinals to Robert Lindstedt and Horia Tecău.

Bracciali also partnered Roberta Vinci in mixed doubles at the 2012 Australian Open. Entering the draw as an alternate, they reached the semifinals. They lost to the fifth seeds Elena Vesnina and Leander Paes after they took the first set. At the French Open, Bracciali partnered Galina Voskoboeva. They reached the semifinals of the tournament, but lost to the eventual champions Sania Mirza and Mahesh Bhupathi. At Wimbledon, Bracciali teamed up again with Vinci and reached the third round. He played with Vinci at the 2012 Summer Olympics, and with Andreas Seppi in men's doubles at the same event.

2013
In 2013, he reached the quarterfinals of the Australian Open in men's doubles partnering Lukáš Dlouhý. They lost to the Bryan brothers in straight sets.

Betting scandal
Following Alessio di Mauro's nine-month ban for betting on matches in November 2007, Bracciali and Potito Starace were each fined and given short suspensions from playing. Bracciali received a fine of £14,300 and a three-month ban from January 1, 2008.

July and November 2007 interceptions between a businessman, Manlio Bruni, and Bracciali were found and they were extensively talking about gaining 50,000 euros each for a set won or lost depending on the match Bracciali was playing. The interceptions were published by several Italian tennis magazines.

In 2015, the Italian Tennis Federation gave Bracciali and Starace a lifelong ban. After a long process, in autumn 2016 ATP confirmed the 2 years suspension, allows the players to play national events. In January 2018, the lifelong suspension was cancelled after absolution of both players. Bracciali came back on court in June 2018, but was once more banned, this time for life, in November of that year and was also fined $250,000.

ATP career finals

Singles: 1 (1 title)

Doubles: 13 (6 titles, 7 runner-ups)

Performance timelines

Singles

Doubles
Current through the 2018 Kremlin Cup.

See also
Match fixing in tennis
Tennis Integrity Unit

References

External links
 
 
 
 
 

1978 births
Living people
Italian male tennis players
Sportspeople from Arezzo
Sportspeople involved in betting scandals
Wimbledon junior champions
Tennis players at the 2012 Summer Olympics
Olympic tennis players of Italy
Australian Open (tennis) junior champions
Grand Slam (tennis) champions in boys' doubles
Match fixers
Match fixing in tennis
Sportspeople banned for life